Many countries have standardized the labeling of fertilizers to indicate their contents of major nutrients. The most common labeling convention, the NPK or N-P-K label, shows the amounts of the chemical elements nitrogen, phosphorus, and potassium.

Common labeling conventions

The NPK analysis label

Fertilizers are usually labeled with three numbers, as in 18-20-10, indicating the relative content of the primary macronutrients nitrogen (N), phosphorus (P), and potassium (K), respectively.

More precisely, the first number ("N value") is the percentage of elemental nitrogen by weight in the fertilizer; that is, the mass fraction of nitrogen times 100.  The second number ("P value") is the percentage by weight of phosphorus pentoxide  in a fertilizer with the same amount of phosphorus that gets all of its phosphorus from P2O5.  The third number ("K value") is analogous, based on the equivalent content of potassium oxide .

Other labeling conventions
In the U.K., fertilizer labeling regulations allow for reporting the elemental mass fractions of phosphorus and potassium. The regulations stipulate that this should be done in parentheses after the standard N-P-K values, as in "15-30-15
(15-13-13)".

In Australia, macronutrient fertilizers are labeled with an "N-P-K-S" system, which uses elemental mass fractions rather than the standard N-P-K values and includes the amount of sulfur (S) contained in the fertilizer.

Fertilizers with additional macronutrients (S, Ca, Mg) may add more numbers to the N-P-K ratio to indicate the amount. The additional numbers are similarly reported in the oxide mass fraction form. For example, a Polish fertilizer labeled "NPK (Ca,S) 4-12-12 (14-29)" has an equivalent of 14% soluble calcium oxide and 29% total sulfur trioxide.

Converting nutrient analysis to composition

The values in an NPK fertilizer label are related to the concentrations (by weight) of phosphorus and potassium elements as follows:

  consists of 56.4% elemental oxygen and 43.6% elemental phosphorus by weight. Therefore, the elemental phosphorus percentage of a fertilizer is 0.436 times its P value.
  consists of 17% oxygen and 83% elemental potassium by weight. Therefore, the elemental potassium percentage is 0.83 times the K value.

The N value in NPK labels represents actual percentage of nitrogen element by weight, so it does not need to be converted.

So, for example, an 18−51−20 fertilizer contains by weight
18% elemental nitrogen,
0.436 × 51 = 22% elemental phosphorus, and
0.83 × 20 = 17% elemental potassium.

As another example, the fertilizer sylvite is a naturally occurring mineral consisting mostly of potassium chloride, KCl. Pure potassium chloride contains one potassium atom (whose atomic mass is 39.09 g/mol) for every chlorine atom (whose atomic mass is 35.45 g/mol). Therefore, pure KCl is 39.09/(39.09 + 35.45) = 52% potassium and 48% chlorine by weight. Pure KCl fertilizer would thus be labeled 0-0-63. Since sylvite contains other compounds that contribute no N, P, or K, it is usually labeled 0-0-60.

NPK values for commercial fertilizers

NPK values for various synthetic fertilizers
 15-00-00 Calcium nitrate
 21-00-00 Ammonium sulphate
 30-00-00 to 40-00-00 Sulfur-coated urea (slow release)
 31-00-00 Isobutylidenediurea (~90% slow release)
 33-00-00 to 34-00-00 Ammonium nitrate
 35-00-00 Ureaform (~85% slow release, sparingly soluble ureaformaldehyde)
 40-00-00 Methylene ureas (~70% slow release)
 46-00-00 Urea (U-46)
 82-00-00 Anhydrous ammonia
 10-34-00 to 11-37-00 Ammonium polyphosphate
 11-48-00 to 11-55-00 Monoammonium phosphate
 18-46-00 to 21-54-00 Diammonium phosphate
 7-7-7 Growmore
 13-00-44 Potassium nitrate
 00-17-00 to 00-22-00 Superphosphate (Monocalcium phosphate monohydrate with gypsum)
 00-44-00 to 00-52-00 Triple superphosphate (Monocalcium phosphate monohydrate)
 00-00-22 Potassium magnesium sulfate (K-mag)

NPK values for mined fertilizer minerals
 11-08-02 to 16-12-03 bird guano
 00-3-00 to 00-8-00 Raw Phosphate Rock (would be 00-34-00 if it were soluble)
 00-00-60 Potassium chloride
 00-00-19 Kainite
 00-00-17 Carnallite

NPK values for biosolids fertilizers and others
 09-00-00 dairy manure
 01-00-01 horse manure
 03-02-02 poultry manure
 04-12-00 Bone meal
 05-05-06 Fish blood and bone
 06-02-00 Milorganite

See also
Fertilizer

References

Agricultural chemicals
Fertilizers
Packaging